Voice of Earth is Chinese singer Alan's debut Japanese-language album released by Avex Trax. The album contains the eight singles alan has released from 2007 to 2009. The album was released on March 4, 2009 in Japan.

Promotion
"Natsukashii Mirai (Longing Future)" was used as the theme song for NHK special, Save the Future, for World Environment Day. Her sixth single "Red Cliff: Shin-Sen" was used to as the theme song for the movie Red Cliff. An alternate version of the song was used to promote the Japanese re-release of the PlayStation 2 game Dynasty Warriors 6. The song "Liberty", is being used as the theme song for Japanese drama, which aired on Tokai TV. The song "Tsuki ga Watashi" was used in the commercials for the pachinko chain Minho Group. "Gunjō no Tani" is being used as the ending theme song for Japanese information program, which airs on Yomiuri TV.

If the customer ordered Voice of Earth via Tower Records, they would have received a special separate CD that contained a new version of Red Cliff: Shin Sen. This was titled as "Red Cliff: Shin Sen (Modern Rock Version)".

Track list

Charts

Japan

Taiwan

Release history

Staff and personnel

Sound Produced By: Kazuhito Kikuchi
A&R chief: Kentaro Furusawa (Avex Trax)
A&R: Maiko Shino (Avex Trax)
Sound director: Yoshihisa Tokuda (Avex Entertainment Inc.)
Mixed by: Koji Morimoto (Prime Sound Studio Form)
Mastered by: Tom Cayne at Sterling Sound, NYC
Visual director: Atsushi Sawamaru (Avex Trax)
Art director: Shinichi Hana
Designer: Tomokazu Suzuki (Momya)
Photographer: Lesley Kee (Supersonic)
Hair & Makeup: Mayumi Watanabe (Gon.)
Styling: Saoli Iguchi
Creative coordinator: Kanako Shino (Avex Marketing Inc.)
Artist promotion: All Promotion Dept. Staff (Avex Marketing Inc.)
Tie-Up coordinator: All Tie-Up Dept. Staff (Avex Marketing Inc.)
Area promotion: All Area Branch Staff (Sapporo, Tokyo, Nagoya, Osaka, Fukuoka)
Sales promotion: Takeshi Nemoto, Atsushi Nishimoto, Tadayuki Minoda, Jun Yogi, Tomoko Nagaoka & All AMI Staff (Avex Marketing Inc.)
Web designer & coordinator: Ayumi Kobayashi (Avex Marketing Inc.)
Web promotion: Naoya Munemura (Avex Marketing Inc.)
A&R desk: Yuka Nakanishi (Avex Trax)
Live coordinator: Jun Ishikawa (Avex Live Creation)
China A&R: Kunio Nakayama (Avex China Co. Ltd)
Artist manager: Chen Tao, Zhang Guanyu (Avex Marketing Inc.)
Artist management supervisor: Yoshihiro Seki, Noriyuki Morizane (Avex Marketing Inc.)
Planner: Jun Harada (Avex Entertainment Inc./Avex Marketing Inc.)
General director: Hiroshi "funaty" Ishimori (Avex Entertainment Inc.)
Supervisor: Hidenori Handa
Executive supervisor: Akihiro Terada (Avex Asia Holding Inc.)
General producers: Ryuhei Chiba, Takashi Akira (Avex Entertainment Inc.)
Executive producer: Masato Matsuura (Avex Group)

References

Notes

Sources

2009 albums
Avex Group albums